Haptosquilla is a genus of crustaceans belonging to the family Protosquillidae.

The species of this genus are found in all oceans.

Species:

Haptosquilla corrugata 
Haptosquilla ectypa 
Haptosquilla glabra 
Haptosquilla glyptocercus 
Haptosquilla hamifera 
Haptosquilla helleri 
Haptosquilla moosai 
Haptosquilla philippinensis 
Haptosquilla proxima 
Haptosquilla pulchella 
Haptosquilla pulchra 
Haptosquilla setifera 
Haptosquilla stoliura 
Haptosquilla tanensis 
Haptosquilla togianensis 
Haptosquilla trispinosa 
Haptosquilla tuberosa

References

Stomatopoda
Crustacean genera